Yxlö is an island in the southern part of Stockholm archipelago, which forms part of Nynäshamn Municipality, Stockholm County, Sweden.

Yxlö is connected to the neighbouring island of Herrö by road bridge, and Herrö is in turn connected to the mainland by a further series of bridges.

External links 
 

Islands of Nynäshamn Municipality
Islands of the Stockholm archipelago
Populated places in Nynäshamn Municipality